The Legalist Revolution was a civil war in Venezuela that was caused by the continuity movement of President Raimundo Andueza Palacio who wanted to perpetuate himself in power through a constitutional reform. Although it was constitutionally stipulated that his term end on 20 February 1892, Andueza planned to reform the Constitution in order to prolong his stay in power for two more years, which is why he was called continuationist.

Joaquín Crespo took up arms on March 11 in his herd of "El Totumo", in Guárico state, starting the war that spread to the rest of the country. The government appointed General Sebastián Castañas, commander of the army, to fight the revolution while Generals Ramón Guerra, Wenceslao Casado and José Manuel Hernández, known as "El Mocho Hernández", joined the legalist movement.

Crespo entered Caracas on the night of 6 October at the head of an army of 10,000 men and immediately took charge of the national executive power. On 21 June 1893, a new Constitution is signed that will establish in its article 63, direct and secret voting, in addition to presidential periods of 4 years in article 71.

Battle of Los Colorados and Battle of Boquerón 
The Battle of Los Colorados and the Battle of Boquerón took place between 3 and 5 October 1892. After the advance of Joaquín Crespo towards Caracas at the head of more than 10,000 men, Generals José Ignacio Pulido and Luciano Mendoza waited for them in Los Teques. Mendoza, Pulido and Guillermo Tell Villegas Pulido withdrew and left Caracas on 6 October. The city was left unprotected, and gangs of looters invaded the residences of Raimundo Andueza Palacio, Pulido, Sarria and other leaders of the defeated government, as well as the offices of the newspaper La Opinión Nacional. A few hours later, Crespo enters the capital, marking the triumph of the Legalist Revolution.

References 

Wars involving Venezuela
1890s in Venezuela